The Cleveland Motor Car Company of Cleveland, Ohio, was manufacturer of one of several  Cleveland automobiles. The company was founded in 1904 by E. J. Pennington.

Advertisements

References

Veteran vehicles
Defunct motor vehicle manufacturers of the United States
Manufacturing companies based in Cleveland
Vehicle manufacturing companies established in 1904
Vehicle manufacturing companies disestablished in 1909
Defunct companies based in Ohio
1904 establishments in Ohio
1909 disestablishments in Ohio